

Stanley Cup playoffs

Beginning in the 1967–68 season, the National Hockey League expanded from six teams to 12.

Notes
1967–68 marked the first full season that all Hockey Night in Canada games (regular season and playoffs) were televised in color. Some 1966–67 games, including the Stanley Cup Finals, were also televised in color. Also, during this time Toronto and Montreal alternated each week hosting the show that was seen nationally, whichever is more competitive. The opposite game was then downgraded to regional status for airing in Ontario or Quebec only. Ward Cornell hosted the Toronto Maple Leafs games at Maple Leaf Gardens in Toronto while Dan Kelly and Ted Darling hosted the Montreal Canadiens games at the Forum in Montreal even if was downgraded to airing in Ontario or Québec.

See also
List of Hockey Night in Canada commentators

References

External links
Hockey Night in Canada - Google Search

CBC Sports
National Hockey League on television
Lists of National Hockey League broadcasters